Ural State Mining University is situated in Yekaterinburg, Russian Federation. It was founded in 1914. In 1917 Nicholas II signed an order titled "On keeping of the Yekaterinburg Institute of Mines under the patronage of His Majesty the Emperor and on giving to this educational establishment the title of The Emperor Nicholas II Ural Institute of Mines".

It is the oldest establishment of higher education in the Middle Urals. It offers education in geology, geophysics, engineering and management of mining, geological prospecting. The university offers dozens of graduate and postgraduate programmes. The geologists of the university have discovered hundreds of deposits in Urals and Siberia.

Ural Geological Museum
The university has a famous museum of minerals founded in 1937 and considered to be one of the greatest public collections of its kind in Europe. The university is also known for its efforts in the maintenance of religious traditions in higher education in Russia and for its chairing of sports and physical culture.

Alumni

 Eduard Rossel - Governor of the Sverdlovsk Oblast
Boris Ryzhy - Poet
 Yury Prilukov - twice world champion in swimming
 Aleksandr Motylev - champion of Russia in chess
 Alexei Kovyazin - four times Olympic champion in biathlon
 Yekaterina Ivaschenko - rock-climber, world champion

External links
The official Ural State Mining University site

Buildings and structures in Yekaterinburg
Universities in Sverdlovsk Oblast
Educational institutions established in 1914
Museums in Sverdlovsk Oblast
Geology museums in Russia
Natural history museums in Russia
University museums in Russia
Schools of mines
1914 establishments in the Russian Empire